Hugh Kilpatrick Gallacher (2 February 1903 – 11 June 1957) was a Scottish football player in the 1920s and 1930s. In 624 senior games, Gallacher scored 463 goals, playing senior league football for Airdrieonians, Newcastle United, Chelsea, Derby County, Notts County, Grimsby Town and Gateshead. Prior to this he also played and scored for then non-league Queen of the South.

He is one of the Scotland national football team's most prolific goalscorers with 24 goals from his 20 internationals, a strike rate of more than a goal a game. Gallacher was one of the Wembley Wizards who beat England 5–1 at Wembley Stadium in 1928.

Early and personal life 
Gallacher was born in Bellshill, Lanarkshire in 1903. He started "biffing a twopenny ball" almost as soon as he could walk. He began a long friendship with Alex James when both were students at Bellshill Academy.

His Irish father had moved to Scotland in search of work in the vast coal mining areas the country had to offer. He soon settled and married a local woman, raising a family with a strict Protestant upbringing. This didn't stop the diminutive Gallacher son from having Catholic friends.

He had been down the Hattonrig Pit at the age of 15, working 10-hour shifts. Aged 16, he left Lanarkshire junior league side Tannochside Athletic to join Hattonrigg Thistle. However fate played a part in his next move up the football ladder. As a spectator he attended to watch Bellshill Athletic (who had previously rejected Gallacher and James for being too small) playing St Mirren Juniors. Bellshill were a man short and Gallacher was asked to play. After hitting his side's goal in the 1–1 draw, he was asked to join the club.

He was barely 17 when he met and married Annie McIlvaney, a girl who worked at the pit where he worked as a miner. The marriage broke up within a few years, although Annie refused to grant Hughie a divorce. Their dispute generated large legal fees, which contributed to his bankruptcy. 
During his early life Hughie had two children; Hughie (Jr), who died before his first birthday, and Jackie Gallacher, who scored prolifically for Celtic in the 1940s.

Soon after he moved to Newcastle in 1925, Hughie met and fell in love with Hannah Anderson, a 17-year-old daughter of the landlord of one of his favourite pubs. They married soon after he divorced from Annie, and they had three sons.

Club career

Queen of the South
In December 1920, Gallacher was picked for the Scottish junior side to play against Ireland at Shawfield. Gallacher hit the Scotland equaliser with a fine header with two minutes remaining in the 1–1 draw. Among those at the game was James Jolly, secretary of Dumfries club Queen of the South. 

Jolly approached Gallacher after the game and offered him a trial at Queens, with the prospect of a £30 signing-on fee and £5 per week plus expenses should he do well in the trial. At the time Queens were in their second season after formation and, cup games aside, played only local fixtures. However it was professional football and that was good enough for Gallacher. Gallacher's name on the team sheet replaced Ian Dickson who was on his way to Aston Villa (they were two of the four players to play in Queens' first three seasons before moving on to successful careers in England's top division, the others being Dave Halliday and Willie Ferguson).

Rejecting the opportunity of an international trial game at Methil, Gallacher made his Queen of the South debut aged 17 against St Cuthbert Wanderers on 29 January 1921. Gallacher scored four goals in a 7–0 victory. The Herald and Courier wrote after the game, "Gallacher was the pick of the front line. He is only a young player but knows all that is required of him in the centre. He gathers the ball to perfection and possesses a first time shot of a deadly nature. His four goals were all well taken and it was not his fault that he did not have more". The contract was waiting for Gallacher after the game.

Gallacher's next game was his senior debut, a Scottish Cup second round tie against Nithsdale Wanderers. Queens lost 3–1. In the 5–2 victory over Dumbarton, the Herald and Courier said of Gallacher, "From the first kick until the last, he showed exceptional dash and had the unusual record of scoring all five goals. He was continuously the source of great danger and showed no mercy with his rocket shooting".

While enjoying a holiday in Dumfries, Gallacher took ill with double pneumonia. Doctors believed that he would never play football again, but a week later he was said to be recovering well. While in Dumfries Infirmary he was approached by directors of Airdrieonians who had noted his performance in a recent challenge game. At this time if a player was not playing league football at any time then he was free to sign for whoever offered a contract. Airdrie offered a contract and Gallacher signed without a second thought. 

In his nine games for Queens Gallacher hit 19 goals, with the game against Hawick on 13 April 1921 being his last. He however returned to Palmerston Park many times to play in and referee charity matches. Gallacher was also among the jubilant crowd who watched Queens win in their 1929–30 season-ending 2–1 Charity Cup final win against Mid-Annandale.

In the week prior to Queen of the South appearing in the 2008 Scottish Cup Final, the club office took a phone call from Gallacher's son who phoned to wish Queens all the best and said his father had always spoken fondly of his time at Queen of the South.

Airdrieonians
He moved back to North Lanarkshire with the transfer to Airdrieonians. On 19 September 1921 Gallacher made his senior Scottish League debut in the 2–0 defeat to Raith Rovers. Gallacher was selected for the first team 15 times that season and hit seven goals. He also helped Airdrie reserves to the Second XI Cup. The following season Gallacher became a first team mainstay as the club finished second. The next season they finished second again, with Gallacher hitting five in a 6–1 win over Clyde that briefly had the Diamonds top of the league. Silverware arrived when Airdrie beat Hibernian 2–0 in the 1924 Scottish Cup Final to claim the club's first senior trophy. In 1925–26 Airdrie had their third straight second place league finish; Gallacher was credited with 35 goals.

He was only 5 ft 5 ins tall and was often on the receiving end of rough treatment. However, because he tended to seek his own retribution, he was often in trouble with the authorities. There was much speculation about a number of English clubs that were out to sign him. The Airdrie fans were incensed and threatened to burn the wooden stand down if he was sold. His last game for the club came on 5 December 1925 in a 2–1 defeat to Morton. In 129 games for Airdrie, Gallacher hit 100 goals.

Newcastle United
Newcastle United's desperation for their new centre-forward meant that they were willing to pay £6,500 (£ today) to capture him. Gallacher signed on 8 December 1925. He made an immediate impact, scoring two goals on his debut four days after signing in the 3–3 home draw against Everton (Dixie Dean hit an Everton hat trick) and scoring 15 goals in his first nine games. He ended the season with 23 league goals in 19 games, ending up as the club's top scorer despite signing halfway through the season.

From the very first match he played in England he was a marked man, hacked and elbowed and gouged by defenders acting on instructions to stop him scoring at all costs. One teammate described how Gallacher would sit in the dressing room, with pieces of flesh hanging from his legs and his socks and boots soaked in blood.

The following season, 1926–27, 23-year-old Gallacher was given the captaincy, and his powerful leadership qualities took Newcastle to the League Championship for the first time since 1909, although his criticism of some of the less talented players in the team did not go unnoticed. Sunderland were still in contention until they were beaten 1–0 at St James' Park on 19 March before a then record crowd of 67,211. The goalscorer was Gallacher, still widely rated today as Newcastle's finest ever player. He scored 36 league goals in 38 appearances, still the highest number of league goals in one season by a Newcastle player

In the 1927–28 season he scored 21 league goals in 32 appearances. In the 1928–29 season he scored 24 league goals in 33 appearances. In the 1929–30 season he scored 29 league goals in 38 appearances.

Whilst at Newcastle United, he scored 143 league and cup goals in 174 appearances. His strike rate of over 82% is the most prolific in the club's history.

A chant reportedly once sung at St James' Park in relation to Hughie went as follows;
"Do ye ken hughie gallacher the wee scots lad,
The best centre forward Newcastle ever had,
If he doesn't score a goal then wu'll put him on the dole,
and wu'll send him back to Scotland where he came from."

Chelsea
Gallacher joined David Calderhead's Chelsea as part of a £25,000 spending spree which also saw the club sign his fellow Scottish forwards Alex Jackson and Alec Cheyne; such was his popularity at Newcastle, when Chelsea visited St James' Park, the home of Newcastle United, that season the attendance was a record 68,386 with several thousand more locked out. Gallacher scored 81 goals in 144 games and was Chelsea's top scorer in each of his four seasons in west London. The team sometimes clicked, such as in a 6–2 win over Manchester United and a 5–0 win over Sunderland but trophies remained elusive.

The FA Cup was to be the closest the club came to silverware. In 1932, the team secured impressive wins over Liverpool and Sheffield Wednesday, and were drawn against Newcastle United in the semi-finals. Tommy Lang inspired Newcastle to a 2–0 lead, before Gallacher pulled one back for Chelsea. The Blues laid siege to the United goal in the second half, but were unable to make a breakthrough and the Geordies went on to lift the trophy.

Gallacher's time there was also marred by suspensions for indiscipline – including a two-month ban for swearing at a referee – and off-pitch controversies. In 1934 he ended up in the bankruptcy court due to a prolonged and acrimonious divorce.

Later career
Gallacher was transferred to Derby County in November 1934 for £2,750. He was taken under the wing of fellow Scotsmen Dally Duncan and an old Newcastle United friend, Jimmy Boyd, and was said to have been as good as gold during his Baseball Ground days. His 38 goals in 51 league games helped Derby finish second in the league to Sunderland in 1935–36, a finish the club have surpassed only twice (both times in the 1970s under the influence of Brian Clough and Dave Mackay). Gallacher hit 40 goals in his 55 games for Derby.

Later in 1941, when the club were investigated by the F.A. over suspected financial irregularities, one of the accusations being that manager George Jobey had paid Gallacher illegal signing on fees. The player refused to admit it, but Jobey, manager of the Rams since 1925, received a stunning ten-year suspension for his part in the scandal.

The following season, 1936, he moved to Notts County for £2,000. His impressive 32 goals in 45 games helped County to a second-place finish in England's third division. In January 1938 he moved to Grimsby Town for £1,000, hitting three goals in his 12 games.

Later in 1938, Gateshead, a modest team languishing in the bottom division, paid £500 for him. "It's grand to be back on Tyneside," said an emotional Gallacher, when he climbed off the train. "My heart has been here ever since I left United eight years ago. I intend to spend the rest of my life with my adopted folk in Gateshead." Crowds at the Gateshead ground soared to 20,000 a week. He hit 18 league goals for the club before retiring from football with the outbreak of World War II.

International career
Gallacher represented Scotland 20 times, hitting 24 goals. Only two players, Denis Law and Kenny Dalglish with 30 each, have scored more goals for the full Scotland team than Gallacher, who averaged 1.2 goals per game from his 20 caps. He won his first cap on 1 March 1924 in a 2–0 victory against Ireland. Scotland won all six games when Gallacher and Alex James were both selected to play; this included the 1928 'Wembley Wizards' 5–1 defeat of England when James netted twice.

In November 1925 Gallacher hit five goals in the Scottish League's 7–3 victory over the Irish League in Belfast. By coincidence in February 1929 he scored a record five times for Scotland in the same city and with the same final scoreline during the 1928–29 British Home Championship (having also scored three against Wales four months earlier in the same competition.)

Retirement and death
Gallacher continued to live in Gateshead, trying a number of careers, one of them being a sports journalist, a role that led to him being banned from St James' Park for his outspoken remarks about Newcastle United. However, he continued to be a popular character on Tyneside. Gallacher turned out in charity matches even at the age of 52. With no savings from his footballing days, he took numerous unremarkable jobs, often menial, to earn a living to support his family. His second wife died in December 1950 from heart disease.

Of one evening in May 1957 Gallacher's son, Hughie Jr. (by his father's second marriage), said in a press interview, "He'd had a drink on that night when the trouble started. Up until then he had never laid a finger on Matt, despite the fact that he could be really cheeky. But on this particular night Matt had gone over the top and dad had reacted. He had picked up an ashtray and threw it across the room, maybe in a fit of temper, I'm sure only to frighten the lad. But it hit Matt on the side of the head and drew blood. Basically this had been a domestic situation that had got a little out of hand and it should have been left at that. But a neighbour who had come on the scene asked if she should get the police and, without thinking, I said yes. If I'd only given myself a minute to think I wouldn't have said it. Yes, I was upset, but I obviously wasn't prepared for the consequences."

For weeks after the alleged assault, Gallacher began wandering the streets. Many people spoke to him including Newcastle players and staff offering support and assuring him that no one would believe the press and their scandalous statements. Many offered to speak on his behalf.

Denied access to his son and with the court appearance looming, Gallacher began to get increasingly irrational. A local reporter friend said he looked like 'a traumatised man walking in a glassy-eyed dream'. Gallacher said to a friend, "It's no good fighting this thing now. They have got me on this one. My life is finished. It's no use fighting when you know you can't win." He was summoned to Gateshead Magistrates Court for Wednesday 12 June 1957.

On 11 June, he posted a short message to the Gateshead Coroner expressing his regrets at what he had caused, adding that 'if he had lived to be 100 he would never be able to forgive himself for having hurt Mattie'. He then wandered aimlessly through the streets ignoring the greetings of several people.

On the day of his death, two young trainspotters watched him for half an hour pacing backwards and forwards on a footbridge over the London-Edinburgh railway line at Low Fell, Gateshead. He was openly weeping, talking to himself and occasionally pounding the bridge rail with his fists. He stepped down from the bridge and killed himself by walking in front of an oncoming express train. When the effects of his father's suicide had subsided Mattie returned home to stay with his elder brother Hughie, before moving to South Africa in 1965.

Legacy

On 13 December 2021, a brick memorial tribute was unveiled to Hughie Gallacher at Pride Park Stadium, Derby County F.C. It is hoped that in time a similar statue campaign will also be kicked off to erect a permanent memorial at St James' Park, Newcastle United.

"A memorial brick in memory of former Derby County centre forward Hughie Gallacher was laid at Pride Park Stadium on 13 December 2021. Gallacher scored 40 goals in his 55 games for Derby between 1934 and 1936 and Derby fan Kal Singh Dhindsa has stepped forward to help ensure that the former Scotland international, who took his own life in 1957 at the age of 54, is remembered long into the future".

On 22 February 2023, his grandson, Andy Gallacher, was on hand to unveil a plaque tribute to the legendary frontman at Gateshead Redheugh F.C.

The tribute was the brainchild of author and historian Kal Singh Dhindsa, a Derby County fan, who produced a similar memorial to the Scotland star outside Pride Park.

Career statistics

International appearances

International goals

Honours

 Queen of the South

 Southern Counties Cup: 1920–21

 Airdrieonions

 Scottish Cup: 1923–24

 Scottish 2nd XI Cup: 1921–22, 1922–23

 Newcastle United

 Football League First Division: 1926–27

 Scotland national team

 British Home Championship: 1924–25, 1925–26, 1926–27, 1928–29, 1934–35

See also 
 List of English football first tier top scorers
 List of footballers in England by number of league goals (200+)
 List of Scotland national football team hat-tricks
 List of men's footballers with 500 or more goals

Notes

References

Sources
Paul Joannou, "The Black and White Alphabet", 1996, Polar Print Group Ltd, 
Paul Joannou, "United, The First 100 Years", 1991, Polar Print Group Ltd,

External links
Profile: Hughie Gallacher, at Scottish Football Association

1903 births
1957 suicides
Footballers from Bellshill
Association football forwards
Scottish footballers
Scotland international footballers
Queen of the South F.C. players
Airdrieonians F.C. (1878) players
Newcastle United F.C. players
Chelsea F.C. players
Derby County F.C. players
Notts County F.C. players
Grimsby Town F.C. players
Gateshead A.F.C. players
English Football League players
York City F.C. wartime guest players
Suicides by train
Suicides in England
English Football Hall of Fame inductees
Scottish Football Hall of Fame inductees
Scottish Football League players
Scottish Football League representative players
Scottish Junior Football Association players
Scotland junior international footballers
Bellshill Athletic F.C. players
People educated at Bellshill Academy